The Xagħra Stone Circle, also known as the Xagħra Hypogeum or the Brochtorff Circle, is a Neolithic funerary complex located in Xagħra, Gozo, Malta. It consists of a series of caves which were used to bury the dead, and which were surrounded by a walled enclosure. It mainly dates back to around 3000 to 2400 BC, although the earliest tombs at the site date back to 4100 to 3800 BC. The caves collapsed sometime before 2000 BC, and the site was later used for domestic and agricultural purposes.

After being discovered in the late 18th century, the site was excavated in the 1820s before being reburied and forgotten. It was rediscovered in 1964, and major excavations took place between 1987 and 1994. It is the only prehistoric stone-enclosed hypogeum in Europe, and it is regarded as one of the most important archaeological sites in Malta along with the megalithic temples and the Hypogeum of Ħal-Saflieni. Recent dating through AMS has added scores of new date estimates of the burials as part of the ERC funded FRAGSUS project and the ToTL project. The isotopic studies indicate changing dietary and climatic conditions and link with broader changes in the local environment.

Etymology
When first discovered in 1788, the site was simply described as an "ancient structure" without a name. After it was depicted in paintings by Charles Frederick de Brocktorff in the 1820s, the site was commonly referred to as the Brochtorff Circle, although it is not known who came up with this name.

The site eventually became known as the Xagħra Stone Circle or the Gozo Stone Circle. According to the archaeologist David Trump, these names are misnomers because 'Stone Circles' in northern Europe and the British Isles refer to a different type of Neolithic structure. In 2009, Trump coined the term Xagħra Circle as the name best describing the site.

Site
The Xagħra Stone Circle originally consisted of a walled enclosure surrounding caves which were used as a necropolis. It has some similarities to the Hypogeum of Ħal-Saflieni, a prehistoric funerary complex on the main island of Malta. However, Ħal-Saflieni is a man-made carved structure, while the Xagħra Stone Circle consists of natural caves which were adapted into a cemetery. Excavations at the site have shown that the bodies of the deceased were dismembered, and the different body parts were buried at separate places.

The site was the burial ground of the same community which built the nearby Ġgantija temple, which is now well-preserved. Several other temples might have stood in the vicinity, including at Santa Verna (where a few megaliths which are probably the remains of an important temple were found) and Ta' Ġesù.

The earliest tombs at the site date back to between 4100 and 3800 BC, during the Żebbuġ phase of Maltese prehistory. There is very little activity from 3800 to 3000 BC, and most of the site is believed to date back to 3000 to 2400 BC, during the Tarxien phase. The caves in which the complex was built were prone to collapse, and they weakened over time so megaliths were used in an attempt to stabilize the roof. The structure finally collapsed at some point before 2000 BC.

During the Bronze Age, the site was probably used for non-funerary domestic purposes, and remains from the Tarxien Cemetery and Borġ in-Nadur phases were uncovered in the area. The land was subsequently used for agricultural purposes until the 20th century.

Discovery, excavations and recent history

The Xagħra Stone Circle was first recorded by Jean Houel in 1788. In the 1820s, Otto Bayer excavated part of the complex through a collapsed cave roof, and Charles Frederick de Brocktorff painted several paintings showing the site during this excavation. The site was filled in by the late 1830s, and its exact location was lost over time. The two monumental pillars which formed the circle's entrance still stood in 1828, but they were subsequently removed.

The complex was rediscovered by the Gozitan researcher Joe Attard Tabone in 1964. It was excavated between 1987 and 1994 by a joint team from the University of Malta, the Maltese Museums Department and the University of Cambridge. These excavations revealed the remains of one of the largest funerary complexes in the Mediterranean, and led to a better understanding of the society who built Malta's megalithic temples. About 220,000 human bones belonging to between 450 and 800 individuals were uncovered during the excavations, along with some animal bones and a series of artifacts, including figurines and architectural fragments.

The Xagħra Stone Circle is regarded as one of the most important archaeological sites in Malta. It is the only stone-enclosed hypogeum in Europe, and the only prehistoric necropolis in Malta which was properly excavated – no records were kept when the human remains and artifacts at Ħal-Saflieni were cleared in the early 20th century. Parts of the site remain unstudied, and efforts are being made to preserve the complex, since it is fragile and prone to collapse.

The site is on government-owned land, and it is managed by Heritage Malta. The remains have Class A protection, and they are listed on the National Inventory of the Cultural Property of the Maltese Islands. The site is not accessible to the public.

References

Further reading

Anon 2004. The Brochtorff Stone Circle. Current World Archaeology 7: 14–23.
Chalmers, R. M. L. 1993.An investigation of the geomorphology and Local Resources of the Brochtorff Circle on Gozo. BA project, Bristol.
Duhig, C. 1996. Burial practices in a Neolithic Maltese hypogeum – the human remains from the Brochtorff Circle, Gozo. In Anderson, S. and Boyle, K. (eds), Ritual treatment of human and animal remains. Proceedings of the First Meeting of the Osteoarchaeological Research Group. Oxford, Oxbow Books, pp. 63–72
Grima, R. 2004. The Archaeological Drawings of Charles Fredrick de Brochtorff. Malta, Midsea Books Ltd and Heritage Malta.
Malone, C. A. T. and Stoddart, S. K. F. 1995. Discoveries at the Brochtorff Circle. Treasures of Malta. Magazine of the Fondazzjoni Patrimonju Malti 1(2): 15–19.
1996. Maltese and Mediterranean Megalithism in the light of the Brochtorff Circle. In Grifoni Cremonesi, R., Guilaine, J. and L'Helgouach, J. (eds), The Neolithic in the Near East and Europe. Colloquium XVI. Megalithism. Preprints of the XIII Congress of the UISPP, Forlì, Italy. Forlì, Abaco, pp. 109–114
Malone, C. A. T., Stoddart, S. K. F., Bonanno, A., Gouder, T. and Trump, D. 1995. Mortuary ritual of fourth millennium BC Malta: the Zebbug Period Chambered Tomb from the Brochtorff Circle at Xaghra (Gozo). Proceedings of the Prehistoric Society 61: 303–345.
Richards, M., Hedges, R., Walton, I., Stoddart, S. K. F. and Malone, C. A. T. 2001. Neolithic Diet at the Brochtorff Circle Malta. European Journal of Archaeology 4(2): 253–262.
Stoddart, S. K. F. 2004. Cycles of Life or eternity: new light on prehistoric Maltese funerary ritual from the Brochtorff Circle at Xaghra2003 Conference in Malta (CD-ROM). Sarasota, Florida, EMPTC, 
Stoddart, S. K. F., Wysocki, M., Burgess, G., Barber, G., Duhig, C., Malone, C. A. T. and Mann, G. 1999. The articulation of disarticulation. Preliminary thoughts on the Brochtorff Circle at Xaghra (Gozo). In Downes, J. and Pollard, A. (eds), The loved body's corruption: archaeological contributions to the study of human mortality. Glasgow, Cruithne Press, pp. 94–105
Trump, D. H., Bonanno, A., Gouder, T., Malone, C. A. T. and Stoddart, S. K. F. 1993. New light on death in prehistoric Malta: the Brochtorff Circle. In Burenhult, G. (ed), The Illustrated History of Humankind. American Museum of Natural History. Vol 2. People of the Stone Age. Hunter-Gatherers and Early Farmers. Old World Civilisations. New York, Harper Collins, pp. 100–101

Buildings and structures completed in the 24th century BC
1788 archaeological discoveries
Prehistoric sites in Malta
Burial monuments and structures
National Inventory of the Cultural Property of the Maltese Islands
Neolithic sites of Europe
Archaeological sites in Malta
Buildings and structures in Xagħra